Kansas City is an unincorporated community in Washington County, Oregon, United States, located approximately  west of Portland. Its ZIP code is 97116, the same as the nearby city of Forest Grove. The area is part of the Forest Grove Rural Fire Protection District. Kansas City is part of the Portland Metro Area.

References

Unincorporated communities in Washington County, Oregon
Unincorporated communities in Oregon